Oreohelicidae is a family of small to medium-sized air-breathing land snails, terrestrial pulmonate gastropod mollusks in the superfamily Punctoidea (according to the taxonomy of the Gastropoda by Bouchet & Rocroi, 2005).

Anatomy
In this family, the number of haploid chromosomes lies between 31 and 35 (according to the values in this table).

Oreohelix, the type genus, is ovoviviparous. Radiocentrum, a subgenus of Oreohelix, is oviparous(Tompa, 1979). The group as a whole generally lacks any apertural barriers or teeth and displays wide variety of shell morphologies (Burke & Leonard 2014).

Genera 
The family Oreohelicidae has no subfamilies.

The type genus is Oreohelix Pilsbry, 1904.

Genera within the family Oreohelicidae include:
 Oreohelix Pilsbry, 1904
 Radiocentrum Pilsbry, 1905

References

External links